Sedecion (Greek: Σεδεκίων), (? – 114) was a bishop of Byzantium. He succeeded Bishop Plutarch in 105, and served in that office for nine years until 114. He was in office during Emperor Trajan's persecution of the Christians.

References 

2nd-century Romans
2nd-century Byzantine bishops
Sedecion